The 2017–18 Detroit Titans men's basketball team, also known as Detroit Mercy, represented the University of Detroit Mercy during the 2017–18 NCAA Division I men's basketball season. The Titans, led by second-year head coach Bacari Alexander, played their home games at Calihan Hall as members of the Horizon League. They finished the season 8–24, 4–14 in Horizon League play to finish in last place. They lost in the first round of the Horizon League tournament to Green Bay.

On March 26, 2018, the school fired head coach Bacari Alexander after two seasons. On June 5, the school hired Texas Southern head coach Mike Davis as the Titans' new coach.

Previous season
The Titans finished the season 8–23, 6–12 in Horizon League play to finish in seventh place. As the No. 7 seed in the Horizon League tournament, they lost Milwaukee in the first round.

Departures

Incoming Transfers

Recruiting class of 2017

Roster

Schedule and results

|-
!colspan=9 style=| Exhibition

|-
!colspan=9 style=| Non-conference regular season

|-
!colspan=9 style=| Horizon League regular season

|-
!colspan=9 style=| Horizon League tournament

References

Detroit Titans
Detroit Mercy Titans men's basketball seasons
Detroit Titans men's b
Detroit Titans men's b